A Taste of Ink is a 2016 French drama film and the directorial debut of Morgan Simon. It premiered in the New Directors section at the 2016 San Sebastián International Film Festival and was awarded by a special mention of the jury.

Plot 
Vincent, 24, is the charismatic singer of a hardcore band and has already tattooed over half his body. With his angelic features and piercing gaze, he's got the world in his hands. But when a new woman enters his father's life, old tensions are inflamed. Vincent can no longer keep his anger and desire in check.

Cast 
 Kévin Azaïs as Vincent
 Monia Chokri as Julia 
  as Hervé
 Julien Krug as Matthew 
 Selim Aymard as Zachary
 Cédric Laban as Ruddy

Festivals 
A Taste of Ink has been selected to fifty festivals, including San Sebastián, Toronto, Rotterdam, Shanghai, Stockholm, Los Angeles, Zurich, Zagreb, Jerusalem, Bordeaux, and Guadalajara. It received fifteen awards.

Awards 
 2014 : Special mention of the jury at Grand prix Sopadin best screenwriter junior prize
 2016 : Special mention of the jury at San Sebastián International Film Festival, New Directors section
 2016 : Best actor award for Kévin Azaïs at Stockholm International Film Festival  
 2016 : Best actor award for Kévin Azaïs and Youth award at Saint-Jean-de-Luz Film Festival 
 2016 : Best director award and Youth award at Tofifest Film Festival
 2016 : Franco-German Youth award at Internationales Filmfest Braunschweig
 2017 : CCAS Award at Angers Film Festival Premiers Plans 
 2017 : Best actor award for Kévin Azaïs at Aubagne International Film Festival international 
 2017 : Special jury award and Youth award at Lecce European Film Festival
 2017 : Best film award at Fiuggi Film Festival
 2017 : Audience award at Katowice Film festival
 2017 : TV5 Monde audience award at French Film Festival of Romania

Nomination 
 2017 : nominated by the French critics to the Louis Delluc Prize of the best first feature film.

Production 
A Taste of Ink was developed at L'Atelier de la Cinéfondation during Cannes Film Festival 2015 and The Jerusalem International Film Lab.

A music video for the American post-hardcore band Being As An Ocean includes unused footage from the movie. It was shot ten days after November 2015 Paris attacks and is dedicated to all the victims. It is a live music video for the song This Loneliness Won't Be The Death Of Me.

The French title "Compte tes blessures" is inspired by the first album of the British band Bring Me The Horizon, Count Your Blessings. In the movie, the main character wears a black Chicago Bulls Michael Jordan jersey which is Oliver Sykes' emblematic outfit. The character who is also a post-hardcore singer has these words tattooed on his chest as a tribute to the band.

References

External links 
 

2010s coming-of-age drama films
2016 films
Films directed by Morgan Simon
French coming-of-age drama films
2010s French-language films
2016 directorial debut films
2016 drama films
2010s French films